Graziano Salvietti (born 25 June 1956) is an Italian former professional racing cyclist. He rode in the 1986 Tour de France.

References

External links
 

1956 births
Living people
Italian male cyclists
Sportspeople from the Metropolitan City of Florence
Cyclists from Tuscany